The Nuremberg rallies (officially , meaning Reich Party Congress) refer to a series of celebratory events coordinated by the Nazi Party in Germany. The first Nazi Nuremberg rally took place in 1933. This rally was not particularly large or impactful; however, as the party grew in size, the rallies became more elaborate and featured larger crowds. They played a seminal role in Nazi propaganda events, conveying a unified and strong Germany under Nazi control. The rallies became a national event once Adolf Hitler rose to power in 1933, when they became annual occurrences. Once the Nazi dictatorship was firmly established, the party's propagandists began filming them for a national and international audience.  Nazi filmmaker Leni Riefenstahl produced some of her best known work including Triumph of the Will (1934) and The Victory of Faith (1933), both filmed at the Nazi party rally grounds near Nuremberg.  The party's 1938 Nuremberg rally celebrated the Anschluss that occurred earlier that year. The 1939 scheduled rally never came to pass and the Nazi regime never held another one as both the government and Nazi Party prioritized Germany's effort in the Second World War over everything else.

History and purpose 
The first Nazi Party rallies took place in 1923 in Munich and in 1926 in Weimar. From 1927 on, they took place exclusively in Nuremberg. The Party selected Nuremberg for pragmatic reasons: it was in the center of the German Reich and the local Luitpoldhain (converted parkland) was well suited as a venue. In addition, the Nazis could rely on the well-organized local branch of the party in Franconia, then led by Gauleiter Julius Streicher. The Nuremberg police were sympathetic to the event.

Later, the location was justified by the Nazi Party by putting it into the tradition of the Imperial Diet (German Reichstag) of the Holy Roman Empire, considered the First Reich. After 1933, the rallies took place near the time of the Autumnal equinox, under the title of "The German people's National Party days" (Reichsparteitage des deutschen Volkes), which was intended to symbolize the solidarity between the German people and the Nazi Party. This point was further emphasized by the annual growth in the number of participants, which finally reached over half a million from all sections of the party, the army, and the state.

Rallies 

Each rally was given a programmatic title, which related to recent national events:

 1923: The First Party Congress took place in Munich on January 27, 1923.
 1923: The "German day rally" was held in Nuremberg, September 1–2, 1923.
 1926: The 2nd Party Congress ("Refounding Congress") was held in Weimar, July 3–4, 1926.
 1927: The 3rd Party Congress ("Day of Awakening") was held in Nuremberg, August 19–21, 1927. The propaganda film Eine Symphonie des Kampfwillens was made at this rally.
 1929: The 4th Party Congress, known as the "Day of Composure", was held in Nuremberg, August 1–4, 1929. The propaganda film Der Nürnberger Parteitag der NSDAP was made at this rally.
 1933: The 5th Party Congress was held in Nuremberg, August 30 – September 3, 1933. It was called the "Rally of Victory" (Reichsparteitag des Sieges). The term "victory" relates to the Nazi seizure of power and the victory over the Weimar Republic. The Leni Riefenstahl film Der Sieg des Glaubens was made at this rally. Hitler announced that from then on all Rallies would take place in Nuremberg.
 1934: The 6th Party Congress was held in Nuremberg, September 5–10, 1934, which was attended by about 700,000 Nazi Party supporters. Initially it did not have a theme. Later it was labeled the "Rally of Unity and Strength" (Reichsparteitag der Einheit und Stärke), "Rally of Power" (Reichsparteitag der Macht), or "Rally of Will" (Reichsparteitag des Willens). The Leni Riefenstahl film Triumph des Willens was made at this rally. This rally was particularly notable due to Albert Speer's Cathedral of light: 152 searchlights that cast vertical beams into the sky around the Zeppelin Field to symbolise the walls of a building.
 1935: The 7th Party Congress was held in Nuremberg, September 10–16, 1935. It was called the "Rally of Freedom" (Reichsparteitag der Freiheit). "Freedom" referred to the reintroduction of compulsory military service and thus the German "liberation" from the Treaty of Versailles. Leni Riefenstahl made the film Tag der Freiheit: Unsere Wehrmacht (Day of Freedom: Our Armed Forces) at this rally, and the Nazis introduced the Nuremberg Laws.
 1936: The 8th Party Congress was known as the "Rally of Honour" (Reichsparteitag der Ehre, September 8–14). The remilitarization of the demilitarized Rhineland in March 1936 constituted the restoration of German honour in the eyes of many Germans. The film Festliches Nürnberg incorporated footage shot at this rally, as well as the rally of 1937.
 1937: The 9th Party Congress was called the "Rally of Labour" (Reichsparteitag der Arbeit, September 6–13). It celebrated the reduction of unemployment in Germany since the Nazi rise to power.
 1938: The 10th Party Congress was named the "Rally of Greater Germany" (Reichsparteitag Großdeutschland, September 5–12). This was due to the annexation of Austria to Germany that had taken place earlier in the year.
 1939: The 11th Party Congress, scheduled for September 2–11, was given the name "Rally of Peace" (Reichsparteitag des Friedens). It was meant to reiterate the German desire for peace, both to the German population and to other countries. It was cancelled at short notice, as one day before the planned date, on September 1, Germany began its offensive against Poland (which ignited World War II) in Europe.

Propaganda films 
Official films for the rallies began in 1927, with the establishment of the NSDAP (Nazi Party) film office. The most famous films were made by Leni Riefenstahl for the rallies between 1933 and 1935. Relating to the theme of the rally, she called her first movie Victory of Faith (Der Sieg des Glaubens). This movie was taken out of circulation after the Night of the Long Knives, although a copy survived in Britain and has recently been made available on the Internet Archive for public viewing. The rally of 1934 became the setting for the award-winning Triumph of the Will (Triumph des Willens). Several generals in the Wehrmacht protested over the minimal army presence in the film: Hitler apparently proposed modifying the film to placate the generals, but Riefenstahl refused his suggestion. She did agree to return to the 1935 rally and make a film exclusively about the Wehrmacht, which became Tag der Freiheit: Unsere Wehrmacht.

The rallies for 1936 and 1937 were covered in Festliches Nürnberg, which was shorter than the others, only 21 minutes.

Books 
There were two sets of official or semi-official books covering the rallies. The "red books" were officially published by the NSDAP and contained the proceedings of the "congress" as well as full texts of every speech given in chronological order.

The "blue books" were published initially by Julius Streicher, the Gauleiter of Nuremberg, later by Hanns Kerrl, not by the party press. These were larger scale books that included the text of speeches and proceedings, as well as larger photographs.

In addition to these, collections of Heinrich Hoffman's photographs were published to commemorate each Party congress, as well as pamphlets of Hitler's speeches. Both series of books are much sought after by collectors.

Hoffman created 100-image series on the 1936, 1937, and 1938 rallies in stereoscopic 3D through his Raumbild-Verlag outfit.

See also 
 Adolf Hitler March of German Youth
 Nazi propaganda
 Ruins of the Reich

References

External links

 A summary of the Nuremberg books from the World Future Fund
 The Schedules for the Parteitags of 1934–1938

1920s in Germany
1930s in Germany
Early Nazism (–1933)
History of Nuremberg
Nazi propaganda
Nazi terminology
Political party assemblies
Recurring events disestablished in 1939
Recurring events established in 1923